Kopalnioki (English: Liquorice, German: Lakritz Bonbons) is a hard Silesian candy without filling, with a mint-anise taste, common since the end of the nineteenth-century.

Ingredients

The candy are produced from sugar, anise oil, hypericum extract, melissa and mint as well as colouring - carbo medicinalis.

Etymology

The name of the candy (kopalnioki, a variation of the Polish word for coal mines, kopalnie or coal miners, kopalnicy) can be explained by the dark colour and coal chunk shape of the sweet. Other explanations state the candy was given to coal miners to protect their throat from coal particles. Coal miners would often take a few pieces for their children and as such popularised the sweet.

See also
List of Polish desserts
List of Polish dishes

References

Silesian cuisine
Polish desserts
Polish cuisine